The 1891 Kansas Jayhawks football team represented the University of Kansas as an independent during the 1891 college football season. In their first and only season under English professor and head football coach Edwin Mortimer Hopkins, the Jayhawks compiled a 7–0–1 record and outscored opponents by a total of 160 to 54. The Jayhawks played their first ever game against rival Missouri on October 31, a game they won 22–8. John Kenzie was the team captain.

Schedule

References

Kansas
Kansas Jayhawks football seasons
College football undefeated seasons
Kansas Jayhawks football